Rubén Pardo Estevez (born June 18, 1979) is a Mexican professional stock car racing driver. He currently competes in the NASCAR Mexico Series. He is the brother of fellow NASCAR driver Carlos Pardo, who died in 2009.

Racing career
Pardo began racing in motorcycles, eventually competing in the 600cc Superbikes Series. After three consecutive championships, he started driving stock cars in the Dodge Neon Series, finishing tenth in points for his rookie season. After graduating from college with a degree in Marketing, Pardo moved to the NASCAR Mexico Series, finishing second in the championship points behind his brother. He began the 2005 season with two wins when he suffered injuries in a jet ski accident. In his first race back, a pair of fire extinguishers exploded beneath his driving seat, breaking both of his legs. After nearly having his foot amputated, Pardo was able to return to racing later that year, picking up an additional win.

In 2006, Pardo moved to the Busch East Series, where he was named Rookie of the Year, becoming the first Hispanic driver to win a NASCAR-affiliated award. His win in the season-ending race at Lime Rock Park made him the first minority to win a Busch East race. In addition to his full-time run in NASCAR Busch East Series this year, he has run a part-time schedule in the Busch Series. He made his debut in the #44 Family Dollar Dodge at Autodromo Hermanos Rodríguez, starting 24th and finishing 41st due to handling problems. His next race came at Nashville Superspeedway, where a vibration forced him out after three laps. He will drive a part-time schedule for Fitz in 2008 in the Nationwide Series.

Motorsports career results

NASCAR
(key) (Bold – Pole position awarded by qualifying time. Italics – Pole position earned by points standings or practice time. * – Most laps led.)

Xfinity Series

Camping World Truck Series

References

External links
 

1979 births
Living people
Mexican racing drivers
Racing drivers from Mexico City
NASCAR drivers